"The Terror of the Transvaal" is a Scrooge McDuck comic story by Don Rosa. It is the sixth of the original 12 chapters in the series The Life and Times of Scrooge McDuck. The story takes place from 1887 to 1889.

The story was first published in the Danish Anders And & Co. #1993-18; the first American publication was in Uncle Scrooge #290, in February 1995.

Plot
The Witwatersrand Gold Rush of 1886 takes Scrooge to Transvaal, South Africa.  His cart is passed by a galloping Cape Buffalo with a Boer duck lashed to its back, screaming for help.  Scrooge rescues the duck and befriends him, not knowing that the duck was sent into the veld by diamond miners he was trying to steal from. Scrooge happily accepts his new friend's offer to keep watch when they camp for the night, but when he wakes up, his wagon, horse, and gear have all been stolen, and he has been left alone surrounded by wild animals.

Just as the animals are about to pounce, Scrooge's hurt gives way to fury and he makes a lifetime vow: "Nobody double-crosses Scrooge McDuck!" He tames the animals with his bare hands, then bridles a lion and rides it into the nearest town. Finding his cart, Scrooge retrieves his pistols and confronts the young Boer in a bar, then humiliates his rival by shooting jars of molasses and a pillow over him, producing the local equivalent of being tarred and feathered. Furious, the Boer runs back to the cart to grab Scrooge's rifle, but doesn't notice the lion in the stable until it's too late.  Scrooge is forced to save the Boer from a severe mauling, before dragging him into the nearest jail. As Scrooge is leaving town, the young Boer yells from his cell that one day he'll be rich enough to take revenge on Scrooge and people like him. Scrooge dismisses this, but concedes that the young duck, whose name he still doesn't know, has taught him a valuable lesson: never trust anyone completely.

The story's closing narration reveals the young Boer's name to be Flintheart Glomgold, who will grow up to be the world's second richest duck, and Scrooge's nemesis.

References to classic Barks stories 
Several of Don Rosa's works featuring Scrooge and Donald Duck are inspired by or contain hidden references to classic comics stories by Carl Barks.  In this volume:
Flintheart Glomgold was first introduced in Barks's story "The Second-Richest Duck", published in 1956; Rosa said that he carefully wrote "The Terror of the Transvaal" to be consistent with that earlier story, noting that, while Scrooge first learns Glomgold's name in "The Second-Richest Duck", there was nothing in that story to indicate that Glomgold did not already know Scrooge;
In the last panels of the story, Scrooge leaves South Africa after realizing that only conglomerates can finance the large-scale mining operations needed to turn a profit on the region's mineral wealth; one of the mines he sees developing is the Kaffir de Gaffir mine, which is the prize contended between Scrooge and Glomgold in Barks's 1966 story "So Far and No Safari."

External links

The Terror of the Transvaal on Duckman
The Life and Times of $crooge McDuck - Episode 6

Fiction set in 1887
Fiction set in 1888
Fiction set in 1889
1993 in comics
Donald Duck comics by Don Rosa
Comics set in the 19th century
Comics set in South Africa
Disney comics stories
The Life and Times of Scrooge McDuck